Sambasa Nzeribe  (born Chiedozie Nzeribe Siztus) is a Nigerian film and television actor, model and entertainer.

Background 
He hails from Anambra State of Nigeria.

Career 
He has featured in a lot of successful Nigerian movies, including A Mile from Home (2013) Out of Luck (2015), Just Not Married (2015), A Soldier's Story (2015), Hotel Choco (2015), The Wedding Party (2016), The Island (2018), Slow Country (2018), Elevator Baby (2019), Kasala (2018) and The Ghost and the Tout (2018).

Award 
In 2016, he won his second consecutive AMVCA for "Best Actor in a Drama".

Filmography 

 A Mile from Home (2013)
 Out of Luck (2015)
 Just Not Married (2015)
 A Soldier's Story (2015)
Hotel Choco (2015)
 The Wedding Party (2016)
My Wife & I (2017)
The Island (2018)
 Slow Country (2018)
 Elevator Baby (2019)
Kasala (2018)
Coming From Insanity (2018)
 The Ghost and the Tout (2018)
 Four Crooks And A Rookie (2011)

Personal life 
Sambasa grew up in a rough environment, having lost his father early on. He grew up in Isolo, Lagos State. He developed the passion for acting while growing up, and was very active with the church choir and drama groups.

Awards and nominations

See also
 List of Nigerian actors

References 

Living people
21st-century Nigerian male actors
Nigerian male film actors
Nigerian male television actors
Nigerian male models
Nigerian entertainers
Year of birth missing (living people)
Male actors from Anambra State
Male actors from Lagos State
Igbo actors
Nigerian film award winners
Actors from Anambra State